Thomas Hope (September 20, 1784 – August 2, 1876) was an American politician from Maryland. He served as a member of the Maryland House of Delegates, representing Harford County, in 1824, from 1826 to 1829, in 1832, from 1838 to 1841 and from 1852 to 1853.

Early life
Thomas Hope was born on September 20, 1784. His great-grandfather was known for his service in the Battle of the Boyne.

Career
Hope served with John Streett's regiment in the War of 1812. He was a member of Captain Joseph Jenkins's company.

Hope served as a member of the Maryland House of Delegates, representing Harford County, in 1824, from 1826 to 1829, in 1832, from 1838 to 1841 and from 1852 to 1853. He was a presidential elector for president Andrew Jackson and was a member of the "Glorious Nineteen", a number of electors that challenged members of the Whig Party and advocated that state senators should be elected by the people.

Personal life
Hope was a member of the Bethel Presbyterian Church.

In April 1876, Hope was runover by a carriage. Hope died on August 2, 1876, at his home near Taylor, Maryland. He was buried at the Bethel Presbyterian Church cemetery.

References

1784 births
1876 deaths
People from Harford County, Maryland
People from Maryland in the War of 1812
Members of the Maryland House of Delegates
Presbyterians from Maryland
19th-century American politicians